The women's RS:X class at the 2014 ISAF Sailing World Championships was held in Santander, Spain 13–19 September.

Results

References

2014 ISAF Sailing World Championships
Windsurfing World Championships
ISAF
ISAF